Ready For Reed – Sam Reed Meets Roberto Magris is an album by jazz saxophonist Sam Reed and pianist Roberto Magris released on the JMood label in 2013.

Reception

The All About Jazz review by C. Michael Bailey awarded the album 4 stars and simply states: "The union of the pair on Ready for Reed is not the standard "blowing session" of the 1950s, but instead a cogent and integrated paradigm of musical ideas expressed as such. This music does not have the hot New York City sound of period Jazz Messengers; it is more like the Philadelphia sound of Bobby Timmons and the Heath brothers, with whom Reed performed." The All About Jazz review by Jack Bowers awarded the album 4 stars and simply states: "Italian-born Pianist Roberto Magris, never one to let labels stand in the way of tasteful and invigorating music, skates from funk to fusion, blues to bop and even ballads on this prismatic album with guest alto Sam Reed, a longtime trouper on the Philadelphia scene who cut his musical teeth with the likes of trumpeter Ted Curson, pianist Bobby Timmons and the redoubtable Heath brothers (Albert, Percy and especially saxophonist Jimmy)." The All About Jazz review by Edward Blanco awarded the album 4 stars and simply states: "It certainly seems clear that Sam Reed was ready to meet and play with Roberto Magris and that the pianist, in turn, was obviously Ready for Reed and, as documented on this superb outing, these two master musician sure know how to make some beautiful music together."

Track listing
 Jungle Strut (Gene Ammons) – 5:47 
 The Swagger (Roberto Magris) – 7:05 
 Love You Madly (Duke Ellington) – 6:49 
 Paris Blues Revisited (Billy Strayhorn) – 7:44 
 Quasimodo (Charlie Parker) – 5:03 
 I Married an Angel (Rodgers/Hart) – 6:58 
 Ready for Reed (Roberto Magris) – 5:06 
 Sweet Jenny Lou (Carpenter/Mundy) – 4:59 
 Be My Love (Cahn/Brodszky) – 5:22 
 Stopstart (Lee Morgan) – 3:37 
 Audio Notebook – 10:45

Personnel

Musicians
Sam Reed – alto sax
Kendall Moore – trombone
Steve Lambert – tenor sax (on 6, 7)
Roberto Magris – piano, Hammond organ
Dominique Sanders – bass
 Brian Steever – drums
Pablo Sanhueza – congas (on 1, 2, 7 e 8)

Production
 Paul Collins – executive producer and producer
 George Hunt – engineering
 Stephen Bocioaca – design
 Jerry Lockett and Nadja Debenjak – photography

References

2013 albums
Roberto Magris albums